The Goats of Monesiglio is a Canadian short documentary film, directed by Emily Graves and released in 2022. The film is a portrait of two families, one Italian and one Punjabi, who work alongside each other as goatherds in the small Italian town of Monesiglio.

The film premiered May 26, 2022 at the Yorkton Film Festival.

The film was a Canadian Screen Award nominee for Best Short Documentary at the 11th Canadian Screen Awards in 2023.

References

External links

2022 films
2022 short documentary films
Canadian short documentary films
2020s Italian-language films
2020s Canadian films
Italian-language Canadian films